The Teddy Bears were an American pop music group. They were record producer Phil Spector's first vocal group.

History
Following graduation from Fairfax High School in Los Angeles, California, Phil Spector became obsessed with "To Know Him Is to Love Him", a song he had written for his group, the Teddy Bears. After a hasty audition at Era Records, which offered to finance a studio session, the Teddy Bears – Phil Spector, Marshall Leib, Harvey Goldstein (who left the group early on), lead singer Annette Kleinbard, and last minute recruit, drummer Sandy Nelson – recorded the song at Gold Star Studios at a cost of $75. Released on Era's Doré label in August 1958, it took two months before "To Know Him Is to Love Him" began to get airplay.

It went on to become a global hit. The record stayed in the Billboard Hot 100 for 23 weeks, in the Top Ten for 11 of those weeks, and commanded the number 1 chart position for three weeks. It also reached number 2 in the UK Singles Chart. It sold over two and a half million copies, and was awarded a gold disc by the RIAA. At 19 years old, Spector had written, arranged, played, sung, and produced the best-selling record in the country. Although subsequent releases by the Teddy Bears on the Imperial label were well-recorded soft pop, they did not sell, and within a year of the debut, Spector disbanded the group. Their demise was hastened by Kleinbard being seriously injured in 1960 in a car accident.

Spector was not the only Teddy Bear who went on to a career after the group broke up.  Harvey Goldstein became a certified public accountant. Annette Kleinbard continued to write and record songs, and changed her name to Carol Connors. Among her credits are the Rip Chords hit "Hey Little Cobra", and the Academy Awards nominated Rocky theme song, "Gonna Fly Now", co-written with Ayn Robbins. Leib joined the Hollywood Argyles, played guitar on some of Duane Eddy's records and produced material recorded by the Everly Brothers amongst others.

Discography
Studio album
The Teddy Bears Sing! (Imperial Lp-9067; 1959)
Track listing:
1. Oh Why (Phil Spector) – 2:27
2. Unchained Melody (Alex North; Hy Zaret) – 2:17
3. My Foolish Heart (Ned Washington; Victor Young) – 2:19
4. You Said Goodbye (Spector) – 1:56
5. True Love (Cole Porter) – 2:00
6. Little Things Mean a Lot (Carl Stutz; Edith Linderman) – 2:27
7. I Don't Need You Anymore (Spector) – 2:40
8. Tammy (from the Universal Studios release Tammy and the Bachelor; Jay Livingston; Ray Evans) – 2:06
9. Long Ago and Far Away (Ira Gershwin; Jerome Kern) – 2:03
10. Don't Go Away (Spector) – 2:23
11. If I Give My Heart to You (Al Jacobs; Jimmie Crane; Jimmy Brewster) – 1:57
12. Seven Lonely Days (Alden Shuman; Earl Shuman; Marshall Brown) – 1:56

Singles

References

External links
Teddy Bears biography & discography
 .

American pop music groups
Doré Records artists
Era Records artists
Imperial Records artists
Musical groups established in 1957
Musical groups disestablished in 1960
Musical groups from Los Angeles
Phil Spector
1957 establishments in California
1960 disestablishments in California